German submarine U-2501 was a Type XXI U-boat (one of the "Elektroboote") of Nazi Germany's Kriegsmarine, built for service in World War II. The submarine was laid down on 3 April 1944 at the Blohm & Voss yard at Hamburg, launched on 12 May 1944, and commissioned on 27 June 1944 under the command of Oberleutnant zur See Otto Hübschen, who commanded her for her entire career.

U-2501 conducted no patrols, and was scuttled at 07:08 on 3 May 1945 at Hamburg. She suffered no casualties to her crew during her short career.

Design
Like all Type XXI U-boats, U-2501 had a displacement of  when at the surface and  while submerged. The submarine was powered by two MAN SE supercharged six-cylinder M6V40/46KBB diesel engines each providing , two Siemens-Schuckert GU365/30 double-acting electric motors each providing , and two Siemens-Schuckert silent running GV232/28 electric motors each providing .

U-2501 was fitted with six  torpedo tubes in the bow and four  C/30 anti-aircraft guns. She could carry twenty-three torpedoes or seventeen torpedoes and twelve mines. The complement was five officers and fifty-two men.

References

Bibliography

External links
 

Type XXI submarines
U-boats commissioned in 1944
World War II submarines of Germany
World War II shipwrecks in the North Sea
1944 ships
Ships built in Hamburg
Operation Regenbogen (U-boat)
Maritime incidents in May 1945